Bob Thorpe can refer to:

Bob Thorpe (outfielder) (1926–1996), American baseball player
Bob Thorpe (pitcher) (1935–1960), American baseball player
Bob Thorpe (politician), American politician and representative in the Arizona House of Representatives

See also
 Robert Thorpe (disambiguation)